The list of Austrian film directors includes Austrian directors and directors born in Austria or Austria-Hungary who made at least one fictional or documentary film for cinema. Directors who were active in more than one era are listed only in that era, where they started their career as director.

Silent film era (1906-1930)

Fictional films
Artur Berger
Eduard von Borsody 
Julius von Borsody
Julius Brandt
H. K. Breslauer
Michael Curtiz
Ludwig Czerny
Géza von Cziffra
Paul Czinner
Alfred Deutsch-German
Karl Ehmann
Friedrich Fehér
Jacob Fleck
Luise Fleck
Fritz Freisler
Josef Hader
Alfred Halm
Emmerich Hanus
Heinz Hanus
Karl Hartl
Franz Höbling
Wilhelm Klitsch
Eduard Köck
Franz Köhler
Anton Kolm
Alexander Korda
Fritz Kortner
Otto Kreisler
Robert Land
Emil Leyde
Hans Otto Löwenstein
Ernst Marischka
Hubert Marischka
Joe May
Wolfgang Neff
Max Neufeld
G. W. Pabst
Arnold Pressburger
Johann Schwarzer
Paul L. Stein
Wilhelm Thiele
Gustav Ucicky
Claudius Veltée
Berthold Viertel

Traditional animation
Peter Eng

Documentary films
Joseph Delmont
Richard Oswald

Early sound film era (1929-1959)

Fictional films 
Otto Ambros 
Franz Antel 
Rudolf Bernauer
Géza von Bolváry
Siegfried Breuer
Rudolf Carl
E. W. Emo
Walter Felsenstein
Willi Forst
Wolfgang Glück
Leopold Hainisch
Eduard Hoesch
Ernst Hofbauer
Paul Hörbiger
Johann Alexander Hübler-Kahla
Otto Kanturek
Rudolph Katscher
Georg C. Klaren
Walter Kolm-Veltée
Anton Kutter
Wolfgang Liebeneiner
Paul Löwinger
Franz Marischka
Georg Marischka
Rudolf Meinert
Kurt Meisel
Gerhard Menzel
Ernst Neubach
Otto Preminger
Harald Reinl
Georg Tressler
Bernhard Wicki
Herbert Wise

Documentary films 
Hans Hass

1960s to 1980s

Fictional films 
Ruth Beckermann
Karin Brandauer
John Cook
Axel Corti
Robert Dornhelm
Valie Export
Michael Glawogger
Wolfgang Glück
Franz Josef Gottlieb
Andreas Gruber
Peter Handke
Michael Haneke
Paul Harather 
Herbert Holba
Gerald Kargl
Peter Keglevic
Peter Kern
Leopold Lummerstorfer
Paulus Manker
Otto Mühl
Rolf Olsen
Peter Patzak
Wolfram Paulus
Stefan Ruzowitzky
Ulrich Seidl
Götz Spielmann

Avant-garde and experimental films 
Kurt Kren
Otto Muehl
Peter Weibel
Rudolf Schwarzkogler

Documentary films 
Hubert Sauper

After 1990

Fictional films
Barbara Albert
Helmut Berger
Klaus Maria Brandauer
Robert Dornhelm
Andrea Maria Dusl
Michael Haneke
Jessica Hausner
Edgar Honetschläger
Jörg Kalt
Nina Kusturica
Ruth Mader
Katharina Mückstein
Anja Salomonowitz
Hubert Sauper
Ulrich Seidl
Harald Sicheritz 
Ludwig Wüst
Daniel Shehata

Fictional and documentary films
Rainer Frimmel
Johannes Grenzfurthner
Erwin Wagenhofer

Experimental films
Titus Leber
Bady Minck
Virgil Widrich

References 
 Walter Fritz: Im Kino erlebe ich die Welt - 100 Jahre Kino und Film in Österreich. Wien 1996, 306 S., Verlag Christian Brandstätter (Anhang Regisseure) 
 Robert von Dassanowsky: Austrian Cinema - A History. McFarland, Jefferson (North Carolina) und London 2005, . (English)

 
Lists of film directors by nationality
Film directors
Directors